Lajos Ódor (born 10 February 1960) is a Hungarian rower. He competed in the men's single sculls event at the 1980 Summer Olympics.

References

1960 births
Living people
Hungarian male rowers
Olympic rowers of Hungary
Rowers at the 1980 Summer Olympics
Sportspeople from Székesfehérvár